Rodney Antwi (born 3 November 1995) is a Dutch professional footballer who plays as a winger for Bulgarian First League club Spartak Varna. Besides the Netherlands, he has played in Bulgaria and Egypt.

Club career
Antwi is a youth exponent from FC Utrecht. He made his Eredivisie debut at 17 August 2014 in a 2-1 home win against Willem II. One week later, he scored his first goal against Feyenoord Rotterdam in a 1-2 away win.
In the summer of 2019 he signed with newly promoted Bulgarian First League team Tsarsko Selo Sofia. On 26 July, he scored the historic first ever goal for the team in the top division of Bulgarian football, in the 1:3 loss against Dunav Ruse. On 10 August, he also netted the two goals for the 2:0 victory against Botev Plovdiv, the first win in the top flight for the club.

On 19 September 2022 he returned to Bulgaria, but this time joined Spartak Varna.

References

External links
Profile - Voetbal International
 

1995 births
Living people
Dutch footballers
AVV De Volewijckers players
FC Utrecht players
Jong FC Utrecht players
FC Volendam players
FC Tsarsko Selo Sofia players
Wadi Degla SC players
FC Inhulets Petrove players
FK Jerv players
PFC Spartak Varna players
Eredivisie players
Eerste Divisie players
Derde Divisie players
First Professional Football League (Bulgaria) players
Eliteserien players
Dutch expatriate footballers
Expatriate footballers in Bulgaria
Dutch expatriate sportspeople in Bulgaria
Expatriate footballers in Ukraine
Dutch expatriate sportspeople in Ukraine
Expatriate footballers in Norway
Dutch expatriate sportspeople in Norway
Association football forwards
Footballers from Amsterdam
Dutch sportspeople of Ghanaian descent